Marcel Lorenz (born 5 January 1982) is a German luger who has competed since 2002. He finished ninth in the men's doubles event at the 2008 FIL European Luge Championships in Cesana, Italy.

Lorenz also finished 12th in the men's doubles event at the 2005 FIL World Luge Championships in Park City, Utah in the United States.

References
 FIL-Luge profile

External links
 

1982 births
Living people
German male lugers
Place of birth missing (living people)